The 2007 WNBA Playoffs was the postseason for the Women's National Basketball Association's 2007 season which ended with the Western Conference champion Phoenix Mercury defeating the Eastern Conference champion Detroit Shock 3-2.

Format
The top 4 teams from each conference qualify for the playoffs.
All 4 teams are seeded by basis of their standings.
The series for rounds one and two are in a best-of-three format with Games 2 and 3 on the home court of the team with the higher seed.
The series for the WNBA Finals is in a best-of-five format with Games 1, 2 and 5 on the home court of the team with the higher seed.
Reseeding (as used in the Stanley Cup playoffs) is not in use: therefore, all playoff matchups are predetermined via the teams' seedings.

Playoff qualifying

Eastern Conference
The following teams clinched a playoff berth in the East:
Detroit Shock (24–10)
Indiana Fever (21–13)
Connecticut Sun (18–16)
New York Liberty (16–18)

Western Conference
The following teams clinched a playoff berth in the West:
 Phoenix Mercury (23–11)
 San Antonio Silver Stars (20–14)
 Sacramento Monarchs (19–15)
 Seattle Storm (17–17)

Bracket
This was the outlook for the 2007 WNBA playoffs. Teams in italics had home court advantage. Teams in bold advanced to the next round.  Numbers to the left of each team indicate the team's original playoffs seeding in their respective conferences.  Numbers to the right of each team indicate the number of games the team won in that round.

Eastern Conference

First round

(1) Detroit Shock vs. (4) New York Liberty

(2) Indiana Fever vs. (3) Connecticut Sun

Conference finals

(1) Detroit Shock vs. (2) Indiana Fever

Western Conference

First round

(1) Phoenix Mercury vs. (4) Seattle Storm

(2) San Antonio Silver Stars vs. (3) Sacramento Monarchs

Conference finals

(1) Phoenix Mercury vs. (2) San Antonio Silver Stars

WNBA Finals: Phoenix Mercury vs. Detroit Shock

References

Playoffs
Women's National Basketball Association Playoffs